"Don't Call Me Baby" is a song by Australian house music duo Madison Avenue, taken as the first single from their only studio album, The Polyester Embassy (2000). Written by Cheyne Coates, Andy Van Dorsselaer, Duane Morrison, and Giuseppe Chierchia, the song includes a bassline sample from "Ma Quale Idea" by Italo disco artist Pino D'Angiò, which in turn is based on "Ain't No Stoppin' Us Now" by McFadden & Whitehead.

"Don't Call Me Baby" was released in Australia on 18 October 1999 and spent six non-consecutive weeks at number two on the ARIA Singles Chart, achieving triple-platinum status. It was also successful internationally, reaching number one in New Zealand and the United Kingdom in 2000. The song has been remixed both in 2014 and 2019 for its 15th and 20th anniversaries, respectively, including remixes by Tommie Sunshine, Mousse T., and Madison Avenue's writer-producer, Andy Van Dorsselaer.

Commercial performance
"Don't Call Me Baby" debuted at number three on the Australian ARIA Singles Chart on 31 October 1999. Three weeks later, the track reached its peak at number two, where it stayed for six non-consecutive weeks. The recording was certified triple platinum by the Australian Recording Industry Association (ARIA), denoting 210,000 shipments of the single. In New Zealand, the song entered the RIANZ Singles Chart at number 39. Two weeks later, the single jumped from number 34 to number two. On its seventh week, "Don't Call Me Baby" peaked at number one on 2 April 2000, where it stayed for one week. The song was awarded a gold certification by the Recording Industry Association of New Zealand (RIANZ) for shipments of 7,500 copies.

In the United Kingdom, "Don't Call Me Baby" originally peaked at number 30 in late 1999 but re-entered the top 75 several times during early 2000, prompting a re-release in May. The re-issued single debuted at number one with first-week sales of 93,794, knocking Britney Spears' "Oops!... I Did It Again" off the top position. As of May 2020, the song has sold 434,000 copies in the United Kingdom, receiving a gold certification from the British Phonographic Industry (BPI) in 2018. In the rest of Europe, the song became a top-10 hit in Greece, Ireland, Norway, and Portugal.

Impact and legacy
In 2011, MTV Dance ranked "Don't Call Me Baby" at number 41 on their list of the "100 Biggest 90's Dance Anthems of All Time". In 2017, BuzzFeed listed the song at number 34 on their "101 Greatest Dance Songs of the '90s" list.

Track listings

1999 releases
 Australian maxi-CD single
 "Don't Call Me Baby" (original mix edit) – 3:49
 "Don't Call Me Baby" (The Dronez Old School mix) – 6:40
 "Don't Call Me Baby" (Alexander Purkart meets the Plastic Park remix) – 7:34
 "Don't Call Me Baby" (original 12-inch mix) – 7:50
 "Don't Call Me Baby" (The Dronez dub) – 6:10
 "Don't Call Me Baby" (original dub) – 7:37

 UK CD single
 "Don't Call Me Baby" (original mix edit) – 3:48
 "Don't Call Me Baby" (The Dronez Old School vocal mix) – 6:35
 "Don't Call Me Baby" (original 12-inch mix) – 7:48

 UK 12-inch single
A1. "Don't Call Me Baby" (original 12-inch mix) – 7:48
B1. "Don't Call Me Baby" (The Dronez Old School vocal mix) – 6:35
B2. "Don't Call Me Baby" (The Dronez dub) – 6:12

 UK cassette single
 "Don't Call Me Baby" (original mix edit) – 3:48
 "Don't Call Me Baby" (The Dronez Old School vocal mix) – 6:35
 "Don't Call Me Baby" (original dub mix) – 7:39

 European CD single
 "Don't Call Me Baby" (original mix 7-inch)
 "Don't Call Me Baby" (12-inch mix)

 European maxi-CD single
 "Don't Call Me Baby" (original mix 7-inch)
 "Don't Call Me Baby" (12-inch mix)
 "Don't Call Me Baby" (dub)
 "Don't Call Me Baby" (Alexander Purkart meets the Plastic Park remix)

2000 releases
 UK CD and cassette single
 "Don't Call Me Baby" (original mix edit) – 3:47
 "Don't Call Me Baby" (Armin van Buuren's Stalker mix) – 6:59
 "Don't Call Me Baby" (Madison Babe from Outta Space remix) – 7:00

 UK 12-inch single
A1. "Don't Call Me Baby" (Armin van Buuren's Stalker dub) – 6:13
A2. "Don't Call Me Baby" (original 12-inch mix) – 6:27
B1. "Don't Call Me Baby" (Madison Babe from Outta Space remix) – 7:00

 US maxi-CD single
 "Don't Call Me Baby" (original mix 7-inch) – 3:47
 "Don't Call Me Baby" (12-inch mix) – 7:48
 "Don't Call Me Baby" (dub) – 7:39
 "Don't Call Me Baby" (Alexander Purkart meets the Plastic Park remix) – 7:24
 "Don't Call Me Baby" (The Dronez Old School vocal mix) – 6:35

 US 12-inch single
A1. "Don't Call Me Baby" (12-inch mix) – 7:48
A2. "Don't Call Me Baby" (dub) – 7:39
B1. "Don't Call Me Baby" (Alexander Purkart meets the Plastic Park remix) – 7:24
B2. "Don't Call Me Baby" (The Dronez Old School vocal mix) – 6:35

Credits and personnel
Credits are taken from the Australian maxi-CD single liner notes.

Studios
 Engineered at Backbeach Recording Studios (Melbourne, Australia)
 Mastered at Crystal Mastering (Melbourne, Australia)

Personnel

 Madison Avenue – production
 Cheyne Coates – writing
 Andy Van Dorsselaer – writing
 Duane Morrison – writing
 Giuseppe Chierchia – writing

 Mark Rachelle – engineering
 John Ruberto – mastering
 Rubber Tree Multimedia – graphic design
 Cube – graphic design
 James Papino – photography and image

Charts

Weekly charts

Year-end charts

Certifications

Release history

References

1999 debut singles
1999 songs
2000 singles
ARIA Award-winning songs
Columbia Records singles
Hut Records singles
Madison Avenue (band) songs
Number-one singles in New Zealand
Number-one singles in Scotland
Songs written by Andy Van Dorsselaer
Songs written by Cheyne Coates
UK Singles Chart number-one singles
Virgin Records singles